David Michael Ritchie Park (1935 – 29 September 1990) was a British computer scientist. He worked on the first implementation of the programming language Lisp.
He became an authority on the topics of fairness, program schemas and bisimulation in concurrent computing. At the University of Warwick, he was one of the earliest members of the computer science department, and served as chairperson.

Notes

External links

1935 births
1990 deaths
British computer scientists
Massachusetts Institute of Technology alumni